Francis Thomson may refer to:

Francis Thomson (bishop) (1917–1987), Scottish Roman Catholic clergyman
Sir Francis Vernon Thomson, 1st Baronet, British businessman

See also
Francis Thompson (disambiguation)
Frank Thomson (disambiguation)